Paliseul is a municipality of Wallonia located in the province of Luxembourg, Belgium. 

On 1 January 2007 the municipality, which covers 112.96 km², had 5,055 inhabitants, giving a population density of 44.8 inhabitants per km².

The municipality consists of the following districts: Carlsbourg, Fays-les-Veneurs, Framont, Maissin, Nollevaux, Offagne, Opont, and Paliseul. Other population centers include: Beth, Bour, Merny, Our, and Plainevaux.

Gallery

See also
 List of protected heritage sites in Paliseul

References

External links
 

 
Municipalities of Luxembourg (Belgium)